Nueva Era, officially the Municipality of Nueva Era,  is a 3rd class municipality in the province of Ilocos Norte, Philippines. It had a population of 11,968 at the 2020 census.

Geography

Barangays
Nueva Era is politically subdivided into 11 barangays. These barangays are headed by elected officials: Barangay Captain, Barangay Council, whose members are called Barangay Councilors. All are elected every three years.

 Acnam
 Barangobong
 Barikir
 Bugayong
 Cabittauran
 Caray
 Garnaden
 Naguillan (Pagpag-ong)
 Poblacion
 Santo Niño
 Uguis

Climate

Demographics

Economy

Government
Nueva Era, belonging to the second congressional district of the province of Ilocos Norte, is governed by a mayor designated as its local chief executive and by a municipal council as its legislative body in accordance with the Local Government Code. The mayor, vice mayor, and the councilors are elected directly by the people through an election which is being held every three years.

Elected officials

References

External links
[ Philippine Standard Geographic Code]
Philippine Census Information
Local Governance Performance Management System

Municipalities of Ilocos Norte